Methylmescaline may refer to:

 α-Methylmescaline
 N-Methylmescaline